Senator Moore may refer to:

Members of the Australian Senate
Claire Moore (politician) (born 1956), Australian Senator from Queensland from 2002 to 2019

Members of the Canadian Senate
Wilfred Moore (born 1942), Canadian Senator from Nova Scotia from 1996 to 2017

Members of the United States Senate
A. Harry Moore (1879–1952), U.S. Senator from New Jersey from 1935 to 1938
Andrew Moore (politician) (1752–1821), U.S. Senator from Virginia in 1804
Edward H. Moore (1871–1950), U.S. Senator from Oklahoma from 1943 to 1949
Gabriel Moore (1785–1845), U.S. Senator from Alabama from 1831 to 1837

United States state senate members
Alfred Moore (1755–1810), North Carolina State Senate
Carolyn Conn Moore (1904–1986), Kentucky State Senate
Danny Roy Moore (1925–c. 2020), Louisiana State Senate
Darius A. Moore (1833–1905), New York State Senate
David Moore (military officer) (1817–1893), Missouri State Senate
Don Moore (politician) (1928–2017), Tennessee State Senate
Don A. Moore (Illinois politician) (1928–2012), Illinois State Senate
Edward E. Moore (died 1940), Indiana State Senate
Frank A. Moore (1844–1918), Oregon State Senate
Frederick Moore (politician) (fl. 2010s), Montana State Senate
Garry Moore (South Dakota politician) (born 1949), South Dakota State Senate
George DeGraw Moore (1822–1891), Wisconsin State Senate
Gwen Moore (born 1951), Wisconsin State Senate
Harvey T. Moore (1809–1878), Wisconsin State Senate
Hugh H. Moore (1844–after 1920), New York State Senate
Jim Moore (Montana politician) (born 1927), Montana State Senate
John Isaac Moore (1856–1937), Arkansas State Senate
John J. Moore (1920–1976), New York State Senate
John Moore (Illinois) (1793–1866), Illinois State Senate
Joseph B. Moore (Michigan judge) (1845–1930), Michigan State Senate
Luther Moore (1821–1892), Maine State Senate
Marilyn Moore (politician) (born 1948), Connecticut State Senate
Michael J. Moore (born 1968), Georgia State Senate
Michael O. Moore (born 1963), Massachusetts State Senate
Orren C. Moore (1839–1893), New Hampshire State Senate
Oscar F. Moore (1817–1885), from Ohio State Senate
Richard T. Moore (born 1943), Massachusetts State Senate
Samuel B. Moore (1789–1846), Alabama State Senate
Tommy Moore (politician) (born 1950), South Carolina State Senate
Tony P. Moore (fl. 1970s–2010s), North Carolina State Senate
William Hickman Moore (1861–1946), Washington State Senate
William J. Moore (1923–2015), Pennsylvania State Senate
William T. Moore (Texas politician) (1918–1999), Texas State Senate
William Moore (congressman) (1810–1878), New Jersey State Senate

See also
Wyman B. S. Moor (1811–1869), U.S. Senator from Maine in 1848
John T. More (1771–1857), New York State Senate